The Type 2 20 mm AA machine cannon was a Japanese-designed anti-aircraft gun, based on the assembly of the German Flak 38. It entered service in 1942.

Design
Introduced in 1942, compared to the earlier Type 98 20 mm AA machine cannon, Type 2 20 mm had higher maximum rate of fire, could be elevated to 95 degrees and had a central fire-control system. The central fire-control system developed for the Type 2 could control and direct six of the guns at once. The gun was based on the German 2 cm Flak 30/38/Flakvierling. The Type 2 number was designated for the year the gun was accepted, 2602 in the Japanese imperial year calendar, or 1942 in the Gregorian calendar.

Variant

Two of the guns mounted together formed a variant known as the Type 2 20 mm twin AA machine cannon. The prototype Type 98 20 mm AAG tank was equipped with this twin Type 2 variant as its main armament. The Type 98 20 mm AAG did not enter production.

References

Notes

Bibliography

 War Department TM-E-30-480 Handbook on Japanese Military Forces September 1944

External links
 Global Security: "Type-2 20mm light automatic anti-aircraft gun
 Taki's Imperial Japanese Army Page - Akira Takizawa

Artillery of Japan
World War II anti-aircraft guns
Anti-aircraft guns of Japan
World War II weapons of Japan
20 mm artillery
Autocannon
Weapons and ammunition introduced in 1942